Caucagua is a Venezuelan city in the state of Miranda, and is capital of the Acevedo Municipality.

The town of later Caucagua was founded as Valle de Araguata about 1690. It was refounded with the name of Caucagua in 1752. Bishop Mariano Martí gave it the name Nuestra Señora del Valle de la Santa Cruz de Caucagua in 1784. The population in 1783 was 2,422. 

In the 2000 census, the population was estimated at 35,000. In comparison with neighboring towns, Caucagua enjoys a fairly strong economic activity thanks to its location at the crossroads between Caracas, the east of Venezuela, and the rest of the Miranda state. The city is also an agricultural nucleus, mainly due to its production of cacao in the bordering areas.

References

Populated places in Miranda (state)
Populated places established in 1690
1690 establishments in the Spanish Empire